The Bank of Rajasthan Ltd was a private sector bank of India which merged with ICICI Bank in 2010.

History

It was set up at Udaipur in 1943 with an initial capital of Rs. 10.00 lacs. An eminent industrialist named Seth Shri Govindram Seksaria was the founder chairman and Late Shri Dwarka Prasad Gupta was the first General Manager. It was classified as the Scheduled Bank in 1948. The Bank also established a rural (Gramin) bank Mewar Anchlik Gramin Bank in Udaipur District in Rajasthan on 26 January 1983.

The bank's central office is located at Jaipur, although its registered office is in Udaipur. Presently the bank has 463 branches,
in 24 states, with 294 of the branches being in Rajasthan.

Merger With ICICI Bank 
RBI was critical of BOR's promoters not reducing their holdings in the company. BOR has been merged with ICICI Bank. ICICI paid Rs. 30 billion for it. Each 118 shares of BOR will be converted into 25 shares of ICICI Bank. dated 12 Oct 1998

References

External links

 History 
 official Website 

Economy of Rajasthan
Organisations based in Udaipur
Indian companies established in 1943
Banks established in 1943
Banks disestablished in 2010
Defunct banks of India
Indian companies disestablished in 2010
Companies listed on the Bombay Stock Exchange